Jerome Michael Trupiano (born in St. Louis, Missouri) is an American radio sportscaster, best known for his former role as a play-by-play announcer for the Boston Red Sox. Trupiano is a graduate of Saint Louis University, where he began his broadcasting career as a disc jockey on the college radio station.

Career

Trupiano called the Red Sox' 2004 World Series-winning game at Busch Stadium. The Red Sox radio team was forced to an auxiliary press box due to all of the media coverage and Trupiano called the game from the booth he had used for practice broadcasts decades earlier.

Departure from Red Sox
On September 27, 2006, the Boston Herald reported that Trupiano's contract would not be renewed  and noted that Trupiano might end up with the St. Louis Cardinals. Trupiano denied that any talks with the Cardinals had taken place.

Current activities
On May 16, 2007, Trupiano was joined by his son Brian to call a game between the Brockton Rox and the Oil Can Boyd's Traveling All-Stars.  The All-Star team features retired major league players Dennis 'Oil Can' Boyd, Bill Lee, Marquis Grissom, Delino DeShields and Ken Ryan.  The game was broadcast on a taped delay by two local Public-access television cable TV stations.

Trupiano also worked as on Westwood One's broadcasts of the NCAA Men's College World Series finals in 2007 and 2008.

In August 2009, Trupiano returned to the air on a regular weekend sports call-in show on 98.5 The Sports Hub Radio (WBZ-FM) in Boston.

Trupiano is also the main sports anchor for Lexy.com, an audio social media startup in San Francisco.  His responsibilities include coverage of the major college and sports leagues, as well as his own commentary feeds such as "View From the Booth" and "Dugout Daily."

In 2010, Trupiano signed on with Fox Sports to become the play-by-play voice of the Ivy League on Fox College Sports.

He is also an instructor at Young Broadcasters of America in Natick, Massachusetts.

Family
Trupiano lives in Franklin, Massachusetts, with his wife, Donna, and two children.  In 2006, his son Brian played for the Brockton Rox, part of the Canadian-American Association of Professional Baseball.

References

External links 
 
Jerry Trupiano Bio at Sons of Sam Horn

1947 births
Living people
American sports radio personalities
Boston Red Sox announcers
College basketball announcers in the United States
College football announcers
Houston Astros announcers
Houston Oilers announcers
Houston Rockets announcers
Major League Baseball broadcasters
Montreal Expos announcers
National Basketball Association broadcasters
National Football League announcers
People from St. Louis
Saint Louis University alumni
World Hockey Association broadcasters